Pure is a 2002 British film directed by Gillies MacKinnon. It stars Molly Parker, Harry Eden, and Keira Knightley.

Cast
 Molly Parker as Mel
 Harry Eden as Paul
 David Wenham as Lenny
 Keira Knightley as Louise
 Vinnie Hunter as Lee
 Marsha Thomason as Vicki
 Geraldine McEwan as Nanna
 Karl Johnson as Grandad
 Gary Lewis as Detective Inspector French
 Kate Ashfield as Social Worker Helen

Awards
Berlin International Film Festival
Won: Manfred Salzgeber Award (Gillies MacKinnon)
Won: Manfred Salzgeber Award - Special Mention (Harry Eden)

Emden International Film Festival
Won: Emden Film Award

British Independent Film Awards 2003
Won: Most Promising Newcomer(Harry Eden)

External links

Official website (archived)

2002 films
Films set in London
2002 drama films
Films about drugs
British drama films
Films directed by Gillies MacKinnon
2000s English-language films
2000s British films
English-language drama films